Peadar Toner Mac Fhionnlaoich (5 October 1856 – 1 July 1942), known as Cú Uladh (The Hound of Ulster), was an Irish language writer during the Gaelic revival. He wrote stories based on Irish folklore, some of the first Irish-language plays, and regular articles in most of the Irish language newspapers, such as An Claidheamh Soluis.

Background
He was born as Peter Toner McGinley in Allt an Iarainn, County Donegal to Micheal McGinley and Susan Toner in 1856. He attended school locally until he was seventeen. He then attended Blackrock College in Dublin for two years. On leaving school he entered into the British Civil Service becoming an Inland Revenue officer. In 1895 he married Elizabeth Woods and they had twelve children. He spoke Irish from an early age and kept an interest in the language throughout his life, first publishing and Irish language short story and poem in The Donegal Christmas Annual 1883. It was not until 1895 while living in Belfast that he became involved in the Gaelic Movement.

Conradh na Gaeilge
The first meeting of the Ulster branch of the Conradh na Gaeilge occurred in Mac Fhionnlaoich's house in 1895. From that point on, he became very involved in Conradh na Gaeilge and became the organisation's president on several occasions.

Seanad Éireann
Mac Fhionnlaoich was a member of Seanad Éireann from 1938 to 1942 when he was nominated by the Taoiseach Éamon de Valera.

Main works
 The Donegal Christmas Annual 1883 (ed.) – (Selection of short stories and poems in English and Irish from Donegal authors.)
 Miondrámanna (1902) – (Three mini plays)
 Handbook of Irish Teaching (1902)
 An Pléidseam (1903)
 Tá na Francaighe ar an Mhuir (1905) – (Play)
 An Léightheoir Gaedhealach (1907) – (Irish language reader)
 Eachtra Aodh Ruaidh Uí Dhomhnaill (1911) – (Folklore)
 Conchubhar Mac Neasa (1914) – (Folklore)
 Ciall na Sean-Ráidhte (1914). Republished as: Ciall na Seanráite (1992). New edition edited by Seán Mac Aindreasa.
 An Cogadh Dearg agus Scéalta Eile (1918) – (Short stories)
 Scríobhnóirí Móra Chúige Uladh 1530–1750 (1925) – (Authors of Ulster)
 Bliain na hAiséirí (1992). Edited by Éamon Ó Ciosáin – (1916 Easter Rising)

References

External links
www.archive.org – Handbook of Irish Teaching
www.archive.org – Conchubhar Mac Neasa

1856 births
1942 deaths
People from County Donegal
Members of the 2nd Seanad
Members of the 3rd Seanad
Irish writers
Nominated members of Seanad Éireann
Independent members of Seanad Éireann
People educated at Blackrock College
Irish-language writers